Dennis R. Larsen is a retired lieutenant general in the United States Air Force.

Career
Larsen joined the Air Force in 1971. His commands included the 49th Fighter Wing, the 363d Air Expeditionary Wing, and the Thirteenth Air Force. In 2005 he was named Vice Commander of the Air Education and Training Command. His retirement was effective as of September 1, 2007.

Awards he has received include the Air Force Distinguished Service Medal with oak leaf cluster, the Defense Superior Service Medal, the Legion of Merit with two oak leaf clusters, the Meritorious Service Medal with two oak leaf clusters, the Air Medal with oak leaf cluster, the Aerial Achievement Medal with oak leaf cluster, the Air Force Commendation Medal with oak leaf cluster, the Combat Readiness Medal with two oak leaf clusters, the Armed Forces Expeditionary Medal, the Global War on Terrorism Service Medal, and the Korea Defense Service Medal.

Education
University of Wisconsin-Platteville
Squadron Officer School
University of Southern California
Air Command and Staff College
Air War College

References

United States Air Force generals
Recipients of the Air Force Distinguished Service Medal
Recipients of the Legion of Merit
Recipients of the Air Medal
University of Wisconsin–Platteville alumni
University of Southern California alumni
Living people
Recipients of the Defense Superior Service Medal
Year of birth missing (living people)